Jiang Xiaochen (born 20 May 1992 in Shanghai) is a Chinese professional football player for Tianjin Fusheng.

Club career
Jiang Xiaochen joined Chinese Super League side Shanghai Shenxin in 2012 after an unsuccessful trial with Guangzhou Evergrande.  He eventually made his league debut for Shanghai on 5 May 2012 in a game against Guangzhou R&F, coming on as a substitute for Zhu Jiawei in the 66th minute.

In March 2016, Jiang was signed for China League Two side Sichuan Longfor.

Club career statistics 
Statistics accurate as of match played 14 October 2017.

References

1992 births
Living people
Chinese footballers
Footballers from Shanghai
Shanghai Shenxin F.C. players
Sichuan Longfor F.C. players
Chinese Super League players
Association football forwards